Gary Gérard Marigard (born 6 January 1988) is a French Guianan footballer who currently plays as a right back for Croix in the French Championnat National 2.

Professional career
After solid seasons in the lower French leagues with ES Wasquehal, and Iris Club de Croix, Marigard moved to US Quevilly-Rouen to help them get promoted to the Championnat National. He successfully helped his team get promoted, and in cup faced both his former clubs. Marigard made his professional debut for Quevilly in a 1–0 Coupe de la Ligue loss to US Orléans on 8 August 2017.

In July 2019, he returned to Croix.

International career
Marigard made his debut for the French Guiana national football team in a 4–1 2013 Gold Cup qualifying loss to Trinidad and Tobago on 10 October 2012.

References

External links
 
 
 

1988 births
Living people
Sportspeople from Cayenne
Association football fullbacks
Association football defenders
French Guianan footballers
French Guiana international footballers
US Quevilly-Rouen Métropole players
Ligue 2 players
Championnat National players
Championnat National 2 players
Championnat National 3 players
Iris Club de Croix players
Wasquehal Football players